Westgate is an unincorporated census-designated place (CDP) in Palm Beach County, Florida, United States. The population was 8,435 at the 2020 census. Prior to the 2010 census, it was listed as the Westgate-Belvedere Homes CDP.

Geography
Westgate is located at  (26.699243, -80.094468).

Demographics

As of the census of 2000, there were 8,134 people, 2,774 households, and 1,908 families residing in the community. The population density was 1,524.5/km (3,944.7/mi2). There were 3,110 housing units at an average density of 582.9/km (1,508.3/mi2). The racial makeup of the community was 62.10% White (41.2% were Non-Hispanic White,) 24.05% African American, 0.61% Native American, 0.90% Asian, 0.07% Pacific Islander, 8.11% from other races, and 4.16% from two or more races. Hispanic or Latino of any race were 32.37% of the population.

There were 2,774 households, out of which 37.4% had children under the age of 18 living with them, 41.4% were married couples living together, 19.6% had a female householder with no husband present, and 31.2% were non-families. 22.8% of all households were made up of individuals, and 7.1% had someone living alone who was 65 years of age or older. The average household size was 2.93 and the average family size was 3.42.

The population was spread out, with 30.8% under the age of 18, 10.8% from 18 to 24, 31.5% from 25 to 44, 18.0% from 45 to 64, and 8.8% who were 65 years of age or older. The median age was 30 years. For every 100 females, there were 101.6 males. For every 100 females age 18 and over, there were 102.0 males.

The median income for a household in the community was $29,659, and the median income for a family was $33,836. Males had a median income of $24,517 versus $19,477 for females. The per capita income for the community was $12,382. About 16.4% of families and 20.8% of the population were below the poverty line, including 26.6% of those under age 18 and 10.8% of those age 65 or over.

As of 2000, English was the first language for 61.25% of all residents, while Spanish accounted for 31.26%, French Creole made up 6.23%, and French was the mother tongue for 1.24% of the population.

References

Census-designated places in Palm Beach County, Florida
Census-designated places in Florida